Eucalyptus dura is a species of small to medium sized tree that is endemic to south-eastern Queensland. It has rough, dark grey to black "ironbark", lance-shaped adult leaves, flower buds in groups of seven, white flowers and conical fruit.

Description
The leaves are the same or a similar glossy green on both sides. Flowering mainly occurs from April to June and the flowers are white.

Taxonomy and naming
Eucalyptus dura was first formally described in 1991 by Lawrie Johnson and Ken Hill from a specimen collected from Turkey Mountain in the Barakula State Forest in 1984. The specific epithet (dura) is a Latin word meaning "hard" or "tough", referring to the bark of this tree.

Distribution and habitat
This ironbark grows in grassy and dry forests in sandy soil, usually on higher places. It occurs between the Biggenden, Chinchilla and Boonah districts in south-east Queensland.

Uses

Essential oils
The leaves of E. dura are rich in oils, particularly β-phellandrene and 1,8-cineole. These oils may be suitable for development of a bacteriostat.

Photo gallery

References 

dura
Myrtales of Australia
Flora of Queensland
Trees of Australia
Plants described in 1991
Taxa named by Lawrence Alexander Sidney Johnson
Taxa named by Ken Hill (botanist)